The 2016 Micronesian Championships in Athletics took place from 2 to 4 June 2016. The event was held in Kolonia, Federated States of Micronesia.

Medal summary

Men

Women

Medal table (unofficial)

Participation

References

Micronesian Championships in Athletics
June 2016 sports events in Oceania
2016 in Federated States of Micronesia sport